Windham High School (WHS) is a public high school in Windham, Maine, United States. It is part of the Windham Raymond School District RSU14 and accredited by the New England Association of Schools and Colleges (NEASC).

References

External links 
 

Windham, Maine
Raymond, Maine
High schools in Cumberland County, Maine
Public high schools in Maine